Geodromus is a genus of beetles in the family Carabidae, containing the following species:

 Geodromus becvari Kataev & Wrase, 2006
 Geodromus dumolinii Dejean, 1829

References

Harpalinae